Galluis is a commune in the Yvelines department in the Île-de-France region in north-central France.

History
The site has been inhabited since the Gallo-Roman epoch.

In 1883, the commune of La Queue-les-Yvelines was detached from Galluis with the dismemberment of the former commune of Galluis-la-Queue.

Notable residents
Antoine-Germain Labarraque (1777 – 1850) was a French chemist and pharmacist, notable for formulating and finding important uses for "Eau de Labarraque" or "Labarraque's solution", a solution of sodium hypochlorite widely used as a disinfectant and deodoriser. He died in Gallius on 9 December 1850.

See also
Communes of the Yvelines department

References

Communes of Yvelines